Perfect Balance is the fourth album by British metal band Balance of Power. It was released in 2001 and is the last album to feature lead singer Lance King.

Production and recording 

Perfect Balance was produced and engineered by Lionel Hicks. It was recorded at POD Studios and Summit Studios, both in London, England. Mixing was handled by Todd Fitzgerald, Lance King and Lionel Hicks at Oarfin Studios, in Minneapolis, US. The tracks "Time of Our Lives" and "The Other Side of Paradise" were the only ones mixed by Dennis Ward, with King and Hicks.

Art design was done by Will Putnam and Lance King.

Track listing 
All songs written by Lance King, Tony Ritchie, and Pete Southern, except where noted.

Personnel

Band members 
 Lance King – lead vocals
 Pete Southern – guitar
 Bill Yates – guitar
 Tony Ritchie – bass guitar
 Lionel Hicks – drums

Additional musicians 
 Leon Lawson – keyboards

Production and recording 
 Lionel Hicks – producer, engineer, mixer
 Lance King – mixer
 Todd Fitzgerald – mixer
 Dennis Ward – mixer on tracks 10 and 11
 Will Putnam and Lance King – art design

References

External links 
Perfect Balance on Balance of Power's official website
Perfect Balance on Amazon
Perfect Balance on AllMusic

2001 albums
Balance of Power (band) albums